"Ey Irân" (| lit. O Iran!) is an Iranian patriotic song that serves as the country's unofficial national anthem. The music was composed by Ruhollâh Xâleqi, and the lyrics were written by Hossein Gol-e-Golâb. This anthem was first performed by Qolâm-Hossein Banân.

History

The song's history dates back to World War II in Iran. In September 1941, the Allied Forces occupied the country following the Anglo-Soviet invasion of Iran. The idea of this poem inspired the poet when he saw the Allied flags waving from the military barracks and the deplorable situation of the country. One day when visiting Xâleqi, Golgolâb witnessed a clash between two Iranian and British soldiers. When Golgolâb recounted the incident, he wanted to write a poem to keep Iran and the Iranian spirit alive in it. Xâleqi decided to compose the song and Banân would sing the poem.

Golgolâb was inspired to write this song by his patriotism. He was quoted as saying:

Ey Irân served as the country's de facto national anthem for a brief period with the establishment of Iran's interim government following the Iranian Revolution in 1979.

Performances
Its first performance was held for two consecutive nights on 27 October 1944 in the military primary school, performed by Banân on Istanbul Street. "Ey Irân" garnered a lot of popularity that listeners demanded its repetition; thus, it was renewed three times. The reception and impact of this anthem caused the then Minister of Culture to invite the musicians to the Sound Broadcasting Center to record a page of it and broadcast it daily on “Râdio Tehrân”.

After the Revolution of 1979, several people were imprisoned for collaborating in the preparation of this anthem, and reading it was considered a crime, but after a while, it was used to provoke soldiers in the Iran–Iraq War, and it was released.

In 1990, Golnuš Xâleqi, the daughter of Ruhollâh Xâleqi, who was in Tehran for the 25th anniversary of her father's death, re-arranged the anthem for orchestra, solo and group singing, which was released on the album May Nab by Soruš Publications. The monologue in this version is Rašid Vatandust.

Lyrics

Persian original

English translation
An English translation can be found here

Notes

See also 
 National Anthem of the Islamic Republic of Iran

References

External links
Ey Irân,  Ruhollâh Xâleqi (music), Hossein Golgolâb (lyrics), Golnuš Xâleqi (arrangement, 1991)
Thousands of Persians sing EY IRÂN in the Nôruz Concert, Oberhausen Arena, March 2014 (VIDEO)
Original version of EY IRÂN anthem with the complete lyrics in Persian
Ey Irân, Ey Irân Video by Daryâ Dâdvar 2007. 
Ey Irân performed by Zoroastrian Gatha Group, MPEG audio.

Historical national anthems
Iranian patriotic songs
Asian anthems
1944 songs
Songs about Iran
Songs of World War II